In mathematics, Denjoy's theorem may refer to several theorems proved by Arnaud Denjoy, including

 Denjoy–Carleman theorem
 Denjoy–Koksma inequality
 Denjoy–Luzin theorem
 Denjoy–Luzin–Saks theorem
 Denjoy–Riesz theorem
 Denjoy–Wolff theorem
 Denjoy–Young–Saks theorem
 Denjoy's theorem on rotation number